Transgender health care, also known as gender-affirming care, includes the prevention, diagnosis and treatment of physical and mental health conditions, as well as sex reassignment therapies, for transgender individuals. Questions implicated in transgender health care include gender variance, sex reassignment therapy, health risks (in relation to violence and mental health), and access to healthcare for trans people in different countries around the world.

Gender variance and medicine 
Gender variance is defined in medical literature as "gender identity, expression, or behavior that falls outside of culturally defined norms associated with a specific gender". For centuries, gender variance was seen by medicine as a pathology. The World Health Organization identified gender dysphoria as a mental disorder in the International Classification of Diseases (ICD) until 2018. Gender dysphoria was also listed in the Diagnostic and Statistical Manual of Mental Disorders (DSM-5) of the American Psychiatric Association, where it was previously called "transsexualism" and "gender identity disorder".

In 2018, the ICD-11 included the term "gender incongruence" as "marked and persistent incongruence between an individual’s experienced gender and the assigned sex", where gender variant behaviour and preferences do not necessarily imply a medical diagnosis. However, the difference between "gender dysphoria" and "gender incongruence" is not always clear in the medical literature.

Some studies posit that treating gender variance as a medical condition has negative effects on the health of transgender people and claim that assumptions of coexisting psychiatric symptoms should be avoided. Other studies argue that gender incongruence diagnosis may be important and even positive for transgender people at the individual and social level.

As there are various ways of classifying or characterizing those who are either diagnosed or self-affirm as transgender individuals, the literature cannot clearly estimate how prevalent these experiences are within the total population. The results of a recent systematic review highlight the need to standardize the scope and methodology related to data collection of those presenting as transgender.

Sex reassignment therapy 

Various options are available for transgender people to pursue physical transition. There have been options for transitioning for transgender individuals since 1917. Sex reassignment therapy helps people to change their physical appearance and/or sex characteristics to accord with their gender identity; it includes hormone replacement therapy and sex reassignment surgery. While many transgender people do elect to transition physically, every transgender person has different needs and, as such, there is no required transition plan. Preventive health care is a crucial part of transitioning and a primary care physician is recommended for transgender people who are transitioning.

Hormone replacement therapy 

Hormone replacement therapy (HRT) is primarily concerned with alleviating gender dysphoria in transgender people. Trans women are usually treated with estrogen and complementary anti-androgenic therapy. This therapy induces breast formation, reduces male hair pattern growth, and changes fat distribution, also leading to a decreased testicular size and erectile function. Trans men are normally treated with exogenous testosterone, which is expected to cease menses, to increase facial and body hair, to cause changes in skin and in fat distribution, and to increase muscle mass and libido.  After at least three months, other effects are expected, such as the deepening of the voice and changes in sexual organs (such as atrophy of vaginal tissues, and increased clitoral size). Regular monitoring by an endocrinologist is a strong recommendation to ensure the safety of  individuals as they transition.

Access to hormone replacement therapy has been shown to improve quality of life for people in the female-to-male community when compared to female-to-male people who do not have access to hormone replacement therapy. Despite the improvement in quality of life, there are still dangers with hormone replacement therapy, in particular with self-medication. An examination of the use of self-medication found that people who self-medicated were more likely to experience adverse health effects from preexisting conditions such as high blood pressure as well as slower development of desired secondary sex characteristics.

Hormone therapy for transgender individuals has been shown in medical literature to be safe, when supervised by a qualified medical professional.

Transgender people seeking surgery may be informed they will need to take hormones for the rest of their life if they want to maintain the feminizing effects of oestrogen or the masculinizing effects of testosterone. Their dose of hormones will usually be reduced, but it should still be enough to produce the effects that they need and to keep them well, and to protect them against osteoporosis (thinning of the bones) as they get older. If they are still on hormone blockers, they will stop taking them altogether.

Monitoring of risk factors associated with hormone replacement therapy, such as prolactin levels in transgender women and polycythemia levels in transgender men, are crucial for the preventive health care of transgender people taking these treatments.

Sex reassignment surgery 

The goal of sex reassignment surgery (SRS), also known as gender reassignment surgery, is to align the secondary sexual characteristics of transgender people with their gender identity. As hormone replacement therapy, sex reassignment surgery was also employed as a response to diagnosis gender dysphoria

The World Professional Association for Transgender Health (WPATH) Standards of Care recommend additional requirements for sex reassignment surgery when compared to hormone replacement therapy. Whereas hormone replacement therapy can be obtained through something as simple as an informed consent form, sex reassignment surgery can require a supporting letter from a licensed therapist (two letters for genital surgery such as vaginoplasty or phalloplasty), hormonal treatment, and (for genital surgery) completion of a 12-month period in which the person lives full-time as their gender. WPATH standards, while commonly used in gender clinics, are non-binding; many trans patients undergoing surgery do not meet all of the eligibility criteria.

Issues affecting transgender patients

Violence 
The heightened levels of violence and abuse that transgender people experience result in unique adverse effects on bodily and mental health. Specifically, in resource-constrained settings where non-discriminatory policies may be limited or not enforced, transgender people may encounter high rates of stigma and violence which are associated with poor health outcomes. Studies in countries of the Global North show higher levels of discrimination and harassment in school, workplace, healthcare services and the family when compared with cisgender populations, situating transphobia as a key health risk factor for the physical and mental health of transgender people.

There is limited data regarding the impact of social determinants of health on transgender and gender non-conforming individuals health outcomes. However, despite the limited data available, transgender and gender non-conforming individuals have been found to be at higher risk of experiencing poor health outcomes and restricted access to health care due to increased risk for violence, isolation, and other types of discrimination both inside and outside the health care setting.

Despite its importance, access to preventive care is also limited by several factors, including discrimination and erasure. A study on young transgender women's access to HIV treatment found that one of the main contributors to not accessing care was the use of incorrect name and pronouns. A meta analysis of the National Transgender Discrimination Survey examined respondents who used the "gender not listed here" option on the survey and their experiences with accessing health care. Over a third of the people who chose that option said that they had avoided accessing general care due to bias and fears of social repercussions.

Mental health 
Transgender individuals may experience distress and sadness as a result of their gender identity being inconsistent with their biological sex. This distress is referred to as gender dysphoria. Gender dysphoria is typically most upsetting for the individual prior to transitioning, and once the individual begins to transition into their desired gender, whether the transition be socially, medically, or both, the distress frequently lessens.

Those who are transgender are significantly more likely to be diagnosed with anxiety disorders or depression than the general population. A number of studies suggest that the inflated rates of depression and anxiety in transgender individuals may partially be because of systematic discrimination or a lack of support. Evidence suggests that these increased rates begin to normalize when transgender individuals are accepted as their identified gender and when they live within a supportive household.

Many studies report extremely high rates of suicide within the transgender community. A United States study of 6,450 transgender individuals found that 41% of them had attempted suicide, as differing from the national average of 4.6%. The very same survey found that these rates were the most high for certain demographics, with transgender youth between the ages of 18 and 24 having the highest percent. Individuals in the survey who were multiracial, had lower levels of education, and those with a lower annual income were all more likely to have attempted. Specifically, transgender males as a group are the most likely to attempt suicide, more so than transgender females. Later surveys suggest that the rate of suicidal attempts for non-binary individuals is in between the two. Transgender adults who have "de-transitioned", meaning having gone back to living as their sex assigned at birth, are significantly more likely to attempt suicide than transgender adults who have never "de-transitioned".

Several studies have shown the relation between minority stress and the heightened rate of depression and other mental illness among both transgender men and women. The expectation to experience rejection can become an important stressor for transgender and gender non-conforming individuals. Mental health problems among trans people are related to higher rates of self-harm, drug usage, and suicidal ideations and attempts.

Health experiences 
Trans people are a vulnerable population of patients with negative experiences in health care contributing to stigmatization of their gender identity. As noted by a systematic review conducted by researchers at James Cook University, evidence reports that 75.3% of respondents have negative experiences during physician visits when seeking gender identity-based care.

Clinic environment 
Guidelines from the UCSF Transgender Care Center state the importance of visibility in chosen gender identity for transgender or non-binary patients. Safe environments include a two-step process in collecting gender identity data by differentiating between personal identity and assignments at birth for medical histories. Common techniques recommended are asking patients their preferred name, pronouns, and other names they may go by in legal documents. In addition, visibility of non-cisgender identities is defined by the work environment of the clinic. Front-desk staff and medical assistants will interact with patients, which these guidelines recommend appropriate training. The existence of at least one gender-neutral bathroom shows consideration of patients with non-binary gender identities.

Clinicians may improperly connect transgender people's symptoms to their gender transition, a phenomenon known as trans broken arm syndrome. Trans broken arm syndrome is particularly prevalent among mental health practitioners, but it exists in all fields of medicine. Misguided investigation of transition-related causes can frustrate patients and cause delay in or refusal of treatment, or misdiagnosis and prescription of a wrong treatment. Misattribution of symptoms to transgender hormone therapy may also cause doctors to erroneously recommend the patient stop taking hormones. Trans broken arm syndrome may also manifest as health insurance companies refusing to pay for treatments, claiming the treated condition is caused by the patient's transgender status, and thus is a pre-existing condition. According to The SAGE Encyclopedia of Trans Studies, trans broken arm syndrome is a form of discrimination against transgender people. A 2021 survey by TransActual shows that 57% of transgender people in the United Kingdom put off seeing a doctor when they were ill. In 2014, 43% of transgender counselling clients in the UK said their counsellor "wanted to explore transgender issues in therapy even when this wasn't the reason they had sought help".

Global access to transgender health care 
Global access to healthcare across primary and secondary health settings remains fragmented for transgender people, with access and services highly dependent on a political administration's support for trans health in policy as well as globally-engrained health inequalities largely shaped by financial wealth inequalities such as the Global North and Global South divide.

Africa

South Africa 
Access to transition care, mental care, and other issues affecting transgender people is very limited; there is only one comprehensive transgender health care clinic available in South Africa. Additionally, the typical lack of access to transition options that comes as a result of gatekeeping is compounded by the relatively limited knowledge of transgender topics among psychiatrists and psychologists in South Africa.

Asia

Thailand 
Transgender women, known as kathoeys, have access to hormones through non-prescription sources. This kind of access is a result of the low availability and expense of transgender health care clinics. However, transgender men have difficulty gaining access to hormones such as testosterone in Thailand because it is not as readily available as hormones for kathoeys. As a result, just a third of all trans men surveyed are taking hormones to transition whereas almost three quarters of kathoeys surveyed are taking hormones.

Europe

Spain 
Public health care services are available for transgender individuals in Spain, although there has been debate over whether certain procedures should be covered under the public system. The region of Andalusia was the first to approve sex reassignment procedures, including sex reassignment surgery and mastectomies, in 1999, and several other regions have followed their lead in the following years. Multiple interdisciplinary clinics exist in Spain to cater specifically to diagnosing and treating transgender patients, including the Andalusian Gender Team. As of 2013, over 4000 transgender patients had been treated in Spain, including Spaniards and international patients.

Beginning in 2007, Spain has begun allowing transgender individuals who are eighteen years or older to change their name and gender identity on public records and documents if they have been receiving hormone replacement therapy for at least two years.

Sweden 
In 1972, Sweden introduced a law that made it possible to change a person's legal gender, but in order to do that, transgender individuals were required to be sterilized and were not allowed to save any sperm or eggs. Apart from this, there were no other mandatory surgeries required for legal gender change. In 1999, people who had been forcibly sterilized in Sweden were entitled to compensation. However, the sterilization requirement remained for people who changed their legal gender. In January 2013, forced sterilization was banned in Sweden.

Depending on the persons health and wishes there are a number of different treatments and surgeries available. Today, no form of treatment is mandatory. An individual with a transsexual or gender dysphoria diagnosis can, together with the assessment team and other doctors, decide what suits them. Although, in order to access medical and legal transitional treatment (e.g. hormone replacement therapy, and top surgery to enhance or remove breast tissue), the person will need to be diagnosed with transexualism or gender dysphoria, which requires at least one year of therapy. Medically transitioning can be very expensive, but in Sweden, the whole treatment is covered by the high-cost protection for medications and doctor's visits and there is no surgery fee. The fee the individual pays for a doctor's appointment or other care represents only a small fraction of the actual costs. If a person would like to change their legal gender marker and personal identity number they will have to seek permission from the National Board of Health and Welfare. For non-binary persons younger than 18 years, the healthcare is very limited. These individuals do not have access to a legal gender marker change or bottom surgery.

In Sweden, anyone is allowed to change their name at any time, including for gender transition.

Up until January 27, 2017, being transsexual was classed as a disease. Two months earlier, in November 21, 2016, around 50 trans activists broke into and occupied the Swedish National Board of Health and Welfare (Swedish: Socialstyrelsen) premises in Rålambsvägen in Stockholm. The activists demanded that their voices be heard regarding the way the country, healthcare, and the National Board of Health and Welfare mistreat transgender and intersex individuals.

Netherlands 

Gender care in the Netherlands is insured under the national health care of third part insurer’s, including laser hair removal, SRS, facial feminization surgery and hormones. Hormones can be prescribed by licensed endocrinologist in a academic hospital from the age 16 and older. Blockers can be prescribed from age 12 when puberty usually starts.

United Kingdom 
In 2018 Stonewall described UK transgender healthcare as having "significant barriers to accessing treatment, including waiting times that stretch into years, far exceeding the maximums set by law for NHS patients". Patients have the legal right to begin treatment within 18 weeks of referral by their GP, however the average wait for patients to gender identity clinics was 18 months in 2020 with over 13,000 people on the waiting list for appointments at gender identity clinics. .

A 2013 survey of gender identity clinic services provided by the UK National Health Service (NHS) found that 94% of transgender people using the gender identity clinics were satisfied with their care and would recommend the clinics to a friend or family member. This study focused on transgender people using the NHS clinics and so was prone to survivorship bias, as those unhappy with the NHS service are less likely to use it.  Despite this positive response, however, other National Health Service programs are lacking; almost a third of respondents reported inadequate psychiatric care in their local area. The options available from the National Health Service also vary with location; slightly differing protocols are used in England, Scotland, Wales and Northern Ireland. Protocols and available options differ widely outside of the UK.

Scotland 
There are four NHS Scotland Gender Identity Clinics providing services to adults and a separate service for younger people. The National Gender Identity Clinical Network for Scotland reported in 2021 that some patients had waited in excess of two years from referral for their first appointment. Minister for Public Health Maree Todd has stated that the Scottish Government wants to reduce "unacceptable waits to access gender identity services". Research has indicated patient dissatisfaction with long wait times. However, overall experience of treatment outcomes was largely positive, particularly for hormone therapy and surgery.

North America

Canada 
A study of transgender Ontario residents aged 16 and over, published in 2016, found that half of them were reluctant to discuss transgender issues with their family doctor. A 2013–2014 nationwide study of young transgender and genderqueer Canadians found that a third of younger (ages 14–18) and half of the older (ages 19–25) respondents missed needed physical health care. Only 15 percent of respondents with a family doctor felt very comfortable discussing transgender issues with them.

All Canadian provinces fund some sex reassignment surgeries, with New Brunswick being the last of the provinces to start insuring these procedures in 2016. Waiting times for surgeries can be lengthy, as few surgeons in the country provide them; a clinic in Montreal is the only one providing a full range of procedures. Insurance coverage is not generally provided for the transition-related procedures of facial feminization surgery, tracheal shave, or laser hair removal.

Blood donation 
Canada's blood collection organization Canadian Blood Services has eligibility criteria for transgender people, which came into effect on August 15, 2016. This criteria states that transgender donors who have not had lower gender affirming surgery will be asked questions based on their sex assigned at birth. They will be eligible to donate or be deferred based on these criteria. For example, trans women will be asked if they have had sex with a man in the last 3 months. If the response is yes, they will be deferred for 3 months after their last sexual contact with a man. Donors who have had lower gender affirming surgery will be deferred from donating blood for 3 months after their surgery. After those months, these donors will be screened in their affirmed gender.

Mexico 
A July 2016 study in The Lancet Psychiatry reported that nearly half of transgender people surveyed undertook body-altering procedures without medical supervision. Transition-related care is not covered under Mexico's national health plan. Only one public health institution in Mexico provides free hormones for transgender people. Health care for transgender Mexicans focuses on HIV and prevention of other sexually transmitted diseases.

The Lancet study also found that many transgender Mexicans have physical health problems due to living on the margins of society. The authors of the study recommended that the World Health Organization declassify transgender identity as a mental disorder, to reduce stigma against this population.

United States 

Transgender people face various kinds of discrimination, especially in health care situations. An assessment of transgender needs in Philadelphia found that 26% of respondents had been denied health care because they were transgender and 52% of respondents had difficulty accessing health services. Aside from transition related care, transgender and gender non-conforming individuals need preventive care such as vaccines, gynecological care, prostate exams, and other annual preventive health measures.  Various factors play a role in creating the limited access to care, such as insurance coverage issues related to their legal gender identity status.

The Affordable Care Act (commonly known as Obamacare) marketplace has improved access to insurance for the LGBT community through anti-discriminatory measures, such as not allowing insurance companies to reject consumers for being transgender. However, insurance sold outside of the ACA marketplace does not have to follow these requirements. This means that preventive care, such as gynecological exams for transgender men, may not be covered.

South America

Colombia 
Transgender women sex workers have cited financial difficulties as barriers to accessing physical transition options. As a result, they have entered sex work to relieve financial burdens, both those related to transition and those not related to transition. However, despite working in the sex trade, the transgender women are at low risk for HIV transmission as the Colombian government requires education about sexual health and human rights for sex workers to work in so-called tolerance zones, areas where sex work is legal.

Health care for transgender youth 

Transition options for transgender adolescents and youth are significantly limited compared to those for transgender adults. Prepubescent transgender youth can go through various social changes, such as presenting as their gender and asking to be called by a different name or different pronouns. Medical options for transition become available once the child begins to enter puberty. Under close supervision by a team of doctors, puberty blockers may be used to limit the effects of puberty.

Discrimination has a significant effect on the mental health of young transgender people. The lack of family acceptance, rejection in schools and abuse from peers can be powerful stressors, leading to poor mental health and substance abuse. A study done on transgender youth in San Francisco found that higher rates of both transgender-based and racial bias are associated with increased rates of depression, post-traumatic stress disorder, and suicidal ideation.

In a 2018 review, evidence suggested that hormonal treatments for transgender adolescents can achieve their intended physical effects. The mental effects of GnRH modifiers are positive with treatment associated with significant improvements in multiple psychological measures, including global functioning, depression, and overall behavioral and/or emotional problems.

In a two-year study published in January 2023, Chen et al. found that gender-affirming hormones for transgender and non-binary youth "improved appearance congruence and psychosocial functioning".

Health care for transgender older adults 
Transgender older adults can encounter challenges in the access and quality of care received in health care systems and nursing homes, where providers may be ill-prepared to provide culturally sensitive care to trans people. Trans individuals face the risk of aging with more limited support and in more stigmatizing environments than heteronormative individuals. Despite the rather negative picture portrayed by medical literature in relation to the depression and isolation that many transgender people encounter at earlier stages of life, some studies found testimonies of older LGBT adults relating feelings of inclusion, comfort and community support.

See also 

 Detransition
 
 Healthcare and the LGBT community
 Standards of Care for the Health of Transsexual, Transgender, and Gender Nonconforming People
 Transgender clinic
 European Network for the Investigation of Gender Incongruence (ENIGI)
 Study of Transition, Outcomes, and Gender (STRONG)

References 

Transgender and medicine